Henry Dunn (1801-1878) was an English educationalist and author of religious books who was for twenty years secretary of the British and Foreign School Society.

Selected publications
 Guatimala, or, The united provinces of Central America in 1827-8: Being sketches and memorandums made during a twelve months' residence in that republic (1828)
 Popular Education, or, The Normal School Manual

References

Further reading 
 G. F. Bartle, "Henry Dunn and the secretaryship of the British and Foreign School Society", Journal of Educational Administration and History, Vol. 18 (1986), pp. 13–22.

External links
 Henry Dunn (Dunn, Henry, 1800-1878) | The Online Books Page

1801 births
1878 deaths
English educational theorists
People from Nottingham
Burials at West Norwood Cemetery
English religious writers